Helen Kelesi and Monica Seles were the defending champions, but chose not to participate together. Kelesi played alongside Andrea Temesvári-Trunkos, but lost in the quarterfinal to Mary Joe Fernández and Martina Navratilova.

Seles successfully defended her title, partnering Jennifer Capriati, by defeating Nicole Provis and Elna Reinach in the finals, 7–5, 6–2.

Seeds 
All seeds received a bye to the second round.

Draw

Finals

Top half

Bottom half

References

External links 
 ITF tournament edition details

1991 WTA Tour
 
Italian Open (tennis)
Italian Open
May 1991 sports events in Europe